Darron Wilkinson (born 22 November 1969) is a former Australian rules footballer who played for Fitzroy in the Australian Football League (AFL) in 1991. 

He was recruited from the Camberwell Football Club in the Victorian Football Association (VFA) with the 17th selection in the 1990 Mid-year Draft. 

After being delisted by Fitzroy he joined the Box Hill Football Club and played over 100 games for them. He is second on Box Hill's all-time leading goalkicker list and was selected in their Greatest Ever Team.

References

External links

Living people
1969 births
Fitzroy Football Club players
Camberwell Football Club players
Box Hill Football Club players
Australian rules footballers from Victoria (Australia)